Edward Arthur Shepherd (18 May 1903 – November 1984) was an English professional football full back who appeared in the Football League for Brentford.

Career statistics

References

1903 births
1984 deaths
Footballers from Harrow, London
English footballers
Association football fullbacks
Harrow Weald F.C. players
Brentford F.C. players
English Football League players